Travel requirements for German citizens are public health and administrative entry restrictions by the authorities of other states placed on citizens of Germany.
As of January 2023, German citizens had visa-free or visa on arrival access to 190 countries and territories. Ranking the German passport 3rd in terms of travel freedom (tied with Spain), with the greatest access of all European Union member states, according to the Henley Passport Index. German Passport is ranked 2nd by the Global Passport Power Rank.

Visa requirements map

Visa requirements

List of territories, disputed areas or restricted zones
Visa requirements for German citizens for visits to various territories, disputed areas, partially recognized countries and restricted zones:

History 
Visa requirements for German citizens were lifted by Zambia (1 October 2022),  Oman (9 December 2020, previously visa on arrival), Uzbekistan (15 January 2019), Cape Verde (1 January 2019), Belarus (February 2017),
Solomon Islands (October 2016), 
Tuvalu (July 2016), 
Marshall Islands (June 2016), 
Palau (December 2015), 
Tonga (November 2015), 
São Tomé and Príncipe (August 2015), 
Vietnam (July 2015-June 30, 2021 at least),
Indonesia (June 2015), 
United Arab Emirates, 
Timor-Leste, 
Samoa (May 2015), 
Kazakhstan (July 2014), 
Mongolia (September 2013) and 
Kyrgyzstan (July 2012).

German citizens were made eligible for eVisas by Russia (January 2021, suspended during COVID-19 pandemic, previously only Kaliningrad and Far East), Guinea and Malawi (October 2019), Saudi Arabia (September 2019), Suriname and Pakistan (April 2019), Tanzania and Papua New Guinea (November 2018), Angola (March 2018), Djibouti (February 2018), Egypt (December 2017), Azerbaijan (January 2017), Tajikistan (June 2016), India (e-Tourist visa from November 2014) and Myanmar (September 2014).

Vaccination requirements

Vaccination requirements map

Certain countries and territories require travellers arriving from Germany to be vaccinated against specific diseases. This is a map of vaccination requirements for German citizens and residents arriving directly from the Schengen area, excluding those arriving from third countries.

Quadrivalent meningococcal vaccination (ACYW135)

Polio vaccination

Yellow fever vaccination

COVID-19 vaccination
Many countries increasingly consider the vaccination status of travellers with regard to quarantine requirements or when deciding to allow them entry at all. This is justified by research that shows that the Pfizer vaccine effect lasts for six months or so.

Passport requirements

Passport not required
German identity card is valid for these countries :
 and Europe (except Belarus, Russia, the United Kingdom [for tourism] and Ukraine)

 French overseas territories

 (de facto)
 (max. 14 days)
 (on organised tours)

 (individuals with pre-settled or settled status, frontier-worker permit or are a Swiss service provider can continue using national identity cards)

Blank passport pages

Passport validity length

Medical passport

Many African countries, including  Benin, Burkina Faso, Burundi, Cameroon, Central African Republic,  Democratic Republic of the Congo, Republic of the Congo, Côte d'Ivoire,  Gabon,   Guinea-Bissau, Kenya, Liberia,  Niger, Rwanda,  Sierra Leone and Togo,  require  incoming passengers older than nine months to one year to have a current International Certificate of Vaccination or Prophylaxis, as does the South American territory of French Guiana.

Entry bans

Criminal record

Persona non grata

Israeli stamps

Biometrics

Right to consular protection in non-EU countries
In a non-EU country where there is no German embassy, German citizens, like all other EU citizens, have the right to get consular protection from the embassy of any other EU country present in that country.

See also List of diplomatic missions of Germany.

See also

Visa policy of the Schengen Area
German identity card
German passport

Annotations, References and Notes

Annotations

References

Notes

Foreign relations of Germany
Germany